Blackface Point is a rocky and precipitous headland  northwest of Cape Freeman on the east coast of Graham Land. The point was photographed by the United States Antarctic Service, 1939–41, and mapped by the Falkland Islands Dependencies Survey, 1947–48. It was named by the UK Antarctic Place-Names Committee in description of the extremely black rock exposed at the end of the point.

References 

Headlands of Graham Land
Bowman Coast